The Old Camp Casino was a tribal casino near Burns, Oregon, United States, owned and operated by the Burns Paiute Tribe.

The "Old Camp" name refers to a tribal settlement that was located on the site in the early 20th century.

History
The tribe had difficulty financing development of a casino due to the reservation's remote location, with only 7,000 people living within a 100-mile radius. Out of four companies that responded to the tribe's 1997 request for proposals, the tribe selected Colorado-based Wolf Gaming to finance and manage the casino. Later that year, however, Wolf Gaming went out of business.

The tribe eventually secured a $930,000 loan from South Dakota-based Indian Gaming of America. The tribe purchased the building itself for $180,000 from the Lummi Tribe, and moved it from northwest Washington to the Burns Paiute reservation.

At opening, there were 53 employees.

Another 100 slot machines were later added, while table games, proving unprofitable, were removed.

The tribe closed the casino on November 26, 2012, due to safety concerns stemming from structural problems with the building. The tribe said it would demolish the building and construct a new one, to be opened in spring 2013, but as of October 2014, it had not opened.

See also
 Gambling in Oregon

References

1998 establishments in Oregon
2012 disestablishments in Oregon
Buildings and structures in Harney County, Oregon
Burns, Oregon
Casinos completed in 1998
Casinos in Oregon
Defunct casinos in the United States
Native American casinos
Native American history of Oregon
Northern Paiute